Helga Pichler was an Italian luger who competed in the mid-1980s. A natural track luger, she won the bronze medal in the women's singles event at the 1986 FIL World Luge Natural Track Championships in Fénis-Aosta, Italy.

Pichler also earned a silver medal in the women's singles event at the 1987 FIL European Luge Natural Track Championships in Jesenice, Yugoslavia.

References
Natural track European Championships results 1970-2006.
Natural track World Championships results: 1979-2007

Italian lugers
Italian female lugers
Living people
Year of birth missing (living people)
Sportspeople from Südtirol
Germanophone Italian people